Harry Butcher may refer to:

 Harry Butcher (racing driver) (1894–1942), American racecar driver
 Harry Butcher (politician) (1873–1956), Liberal party member of the Canadian House of Commons
 Harry C. Butcher (1901–1985), radio broadcaster and Naval Aide to General Dwight D. Eisenhower

See also
Henry Butcher (disambiguation)